Jonny Rees is a current Hong Kong Rugby Union player. He plays for the Hong Kong Football Club, the Hong Kong National Team and previously for the Hong Kong Sevens team. Rees made his international debut in 2012 at the 2012 Cup of Nations tournament in Dubai against . He featured in the 2013 Asian Five Nations match against the  where he scored two tries to help  to a 59 – 20 victory in Manila. He had also scored two tries earlier in the tournament against the  beating them 53 – 7.

Rees was included in the squad to the 2015 Asian Rugby Championship.

References

Hong Kong international rugby union players
Hong Kong international rugby sevens players
Living people
Year of birth missing (living people)
Hong Kong rugby union players